W. E. B. DuBois School, also known as Wake Forest Graded School (Colored), Wake Forest Colored High School, and Wake Forest-Rolesville Middle School, is a historic Rosenwald School building and school complex located at Wake Forest, Wake County, North Carolina.  The elementary school was built in 1926, consists of a one-story, seven bay, brick veneer, main block with a rear ell and Colonial Revival style design elements. It has a side gable roof and front portico. The High School Building was built in 1939 with funds provided by the Public Works Administration. It is a one-story, rectangular brick block with a hipped roof and slightly projecting gabled portico.  The Agriculture Building/Shop was brought to this site in 1942. It is a one-story, "L"-shaped brick building, with the addition built about 1952–1953.

It was listed on the National Register of Historic Places in 1993.

References

Rosenwald schools in North Carolina
Public Works Administration in North Carolina
School buildings on the National Register of Historic Places in North Carolina
Colonial Revival architecture in North Carolina
School buildings completed in 1926
Schools in Wake County, North Carolina
National Register of Historic Places in Wake County, North Carolina
1926 establishments in North Carolina